The Return of Superman (also known as Superman Is Back) is a South Korean reality-variety show that airs on KBS2. The Return of Superman used to be one of the two segments (the other segment is 1 Night 2 Days) on Happy Sunday. The original three episodes pilot aired as a Chuseok holiday special from September 19 till September 21 of 2013, starring Lee Hwi-jae, Choo Sung-hoon, Jang Hyun-sung. The show is narrated by entertainer/singer Yuk Joong-wan and actress So Yoo-jin.

KBS announced on Oct 17, 2013, that The Return of Superman will officially become part of the Happy Sunday lineup starting on November 3, 2013. The show replaces Star Family Show Mamma Mia, which was moved to Wednesday nights. From April 22, 2022, it was changed from 9:00 pm on Sunday to 10:05 pm on Friday.

Synopsis
Celebrity dads are left to care for their kids alone for 48 hours without the help of anyone else, while their wives leave home to enjoy some relaxing time off. The wives are shown leaving the home before the 48 hours begins and coming back to greet their family once the 48 hours have ended. During the 48 hours the dads and children are either doing a task the wives have written out for the dads to complete, or the dads are exploring new activities with their kids. Occasionally celebrity friends of the dads will stop by to interact with the kids.

Format

The show is filmed with set up cameras and cameraman hiding in tents and playhouses in each of the celebrities' actual home. Family and friends of the celebrity dads will occasionally show up in episodes. In each episode, as the show moves from one family to the next, a brief narration by the narrator is given to introduce the next segment of the episode.

During each individual family segment the parents (husband and wife), with the exception of Junu, Junseo and Haru who were old enough to answer questions when they started the show, would give a talking head interview while being asked questions by the shows PDs (producers) about the current situation being aired.

Cast

Current cast
*Children are listed from oldest to youngest, and families are listed in order of appearance on the show.

Former cast

*Families and narrators are listed in order of exiting the show.

Special cast

Timeline

Cast history
 Lee Hyun-woo could not participate in the show when it was picked up on Happy Sunday due to conflicting schedule.
 Yoo Ho-jeong was the original narrator for episodes 1 and 2 of the Chuseok Special, there was no narrator for episode 3 of the special episodes.
 Tablo and his daughter Haru joined the cast starting from episode 1 of season 1 to replace Lee Hyun-woo's spot.
 Chae Sira became the narrator starting from season 1, her last episode was the 27th. Chae decided to leave the show due to her conflicting schedule.
 Kim Jung-tae and his son Ji-hoo (Yakkung) guest starred on episodes 20 and 21 as part of Jang Hyun-sung's segment, the two were invited to officially join the cast because of the show's extended time slot.
 Shin Ae-ra took over as narrator starting from episode 28. She was approached to join the show because of her reputation as a caring mother in real life.
 Kim Jung-tae and his son Yakkung opted to leave the show following controversy of them attending a campaign rally for a local politician. Episode 31 is their last.
 Jang Yoon-jung and Do Kyung-wan will be guest cast from episode 32. They will fill the spot left open by the departure of Kim Jung-tae and his son Yakkung. The couple will chronicle the birth of their son.
 Jang Hyun-sung's agency announced on June 24, 2014, that the actor and his sons would be leaving the show due to conflicting schedule with filming his drama Ceci Bon and movie Love Wins. He and his family last appearance is episode 33.
 Song Il-kook was announced on June 25, 2014, to be joining the cast of Superman along with his triplet sons. Their first episode will air on July 6.
 It was announced on July 20 that Shin Ae-ra would be stepping down as the narrator of the show to concentrate on her studies in the United States. Her last episode will be the 37th. Heo Su-gyeong, who previously guest starred on the show will be taking over as the narrator.
 On December 1, 2014, Tablo and his daughter Haru announced that both will be leaving the show due to Tablo's  conflicting schedule with promoting his music career and filming the show. Episode 58 will be their last.
 Actor Uhm Tae-woong was announced on December 1, 2014, to be joining the show with his daughter Uhm Ji-on. The new father/daughter duo will be taking the place of exiting cast family Tablo and Haru.
 A press release was issued on January 6, 2015, announcing actress and wife of Sean from Jinusean, Jung Hye-young as the narrator of the show starting from episode 60. No reason was given for the exiting of most current narrator Heo Su-gyeong.
 On July 13, 2015, KBS confirmed professional soccer player Lee Dong-gook will be joining the cast part-time with his five children.
 On October 14, 2015, the shows PD Kang Bong Kyu, confirmed that actor Uhm Tae-woong and his family will be leaving the show so that he and his wife can concentrate on the main careers as an actor and ballerina. When Uhm Tae-woong's wife Yoon Hye-jin, appeared on the variety show "Taxi" in November 2015 she further clarified another reason was that they didn't want Jion growing up in the spotlight thinking she was privileged.
 On December 21, 2015, KBS announced that Song Il-gook and the triplets will be leaving the show for an undisclosed reason. Episode 116 will be their last.
 On December 9, 2015, the PDs of the show confirmed that actor Ki Tae Young had started filming for show. His family replaces Uhm Tae Woong's who had recently left the show.
 On January 27, 2016, it was confirmed that actor Lee Beom-soo would be joining the show. His family will be taking over the slot of Song Il-gook's family after they leave the show sometime in February.
 In later February 2016 an insider informed the media that Choo Sung Hoon and his daughter Sarang would be leaving the show. PD of the show did not confirm the news because Choo and his family did not finish filming yet. On February 28, 2016, it was confirmed the Choos will be leaving the show after Sung Hoon's wife Shiho Yano posted an invite for fans to attend their final filming on her Instagram account. The Choos last episode will air in late March 2016. With Choo Sung Hoon leaving the show, Lee Hwi Jae remains the only original cast member since the show premiered.
 On April 22, 2016, KBS revealed that actors Oh Ji-ho, In Gyo-jin and Yang Dong-geun and their respective children would be joining the show. Yang Dong-geun's first episode will be on Episode 127 while Oh Ji-ho and In Gyo-jin's will be on Episode 129 and 130 respectively.
 In October 2016, it was announced that Sam Hammington and his son William would be joining the show. Their first episode will be on Episode 154.
 In November 2016, it was revealed that singer Ko Ji-young would be joining the show. Their first episode will be on Episode 163.
 On May 10, 2017, it was announced that actor Lee Beom-soo and his kids would be leaving the show in order for Lee to focus on directing his film. Episode 182 will be their last. Lee had originally joined the program as a way to spend time with his children while he recovered from his leg injury.
 During the previews at the end of episode 183, Professor Robert Kelly of Pusan National University were shown as the new family joining the show. The Kelly family rose to popularity when his young children crashed his live interview with the BBC and the video of the incident went viral.
 On October 3, 2019, Lee Dong Guk's wife posted on social media announcing her family's departure from the program.
 On January 19, 2020, broadcast, Park Joo Ho announces his family will take a hiatus from the program in order to take care of his wife Anna's delivery of their third child in Switzerland, born on January 13, 2020.
 On February 2, 2020, broadcast, Kang Gary and his son Kang Ha-Oh first joined the show. Kang Gary returned to entertainment after 3 years hiatus.
On April 6, 2020, broadcast, it was revealed that actor, singer, model Min Woo-hyuk and his son Park Yi-deun would be joining the show. The first episode will be on Episode 324.

Episodes

Un-aired X-files
The X-files are film clips that didn't make it to broadcast on the regular program. These clips can be seen on Korean paid subscription web streaming site Cable TV VOD. The clips are narrated by different guests each time, such as Lee Hye-ri from Korean girls idol group Girl's Day.

Sponsors
LG is the main sponsor of the show. All the "Superman" families prominently display or use the LG's S Homeboy tablet made by Samsung throughout each episode. Besides the S Homeboy tablet, each Superman family use or display products they individually endorse on the show.

NOTE: These are only products shown on the show. Not a complete list of each cast member endorsements.

 Jang Hyun-sung
 Tommy Hilfiger Kids
 Lee Hwi-jae
 Huggies diaper
 Fedora baby stroller
 Manduca baby carriers
 allo&lugh children's clothing
 MOLDIR
 DAKS Accessories
 Finden Bebe
 Lotte Card
 Babience
 MoiMoi Kamppi

 Choo Sung-hoon
 Jimy's Charmer lifestyle brand
 allo&lugh children's clothing
 Seoul Milk yogurt
 DreamB Kidsmat
 New Balance
 Del Monte Fruit
 Tablo
 Black Yak clothing
 MOLDIR

 Song Il Gook
 Samsung Electronic
 DUOLAC
 Skärbarn
 Hana Financial Group
 CARNIVAL|Limousine
 Minute Maid 
 LG Aircon
 Lee Dong-gook
 Adidas

International version
In April 2014, China's Zhejiang Television (ZJTV) began airing a Chinese version of The Return of Superman called Dad is Back starring former Taiwanese boy band Fahrenheit member Wu Chun, film producer Zhong Lei Wang, actor Jia Nailiang, and former gymnast Li Xiapeng. The show is in collaboration with the producers of the Korean KBS version and follows the same concept as the Korean version with the exception of a narrator. The title of the Chinese version was renamed in order to clear up plagiarism rumors. In March 2017, Thailand Channel 7 began airing a Thai version of The Return of Superman called The Return of Superman Thailand. In April 2022, Viettel began airing a Vietnamese version of The Return of Superman called "MẸ VẮNG NHÀ BA LÀ SIÊU NHÂN".

Awards and nominations

See also
 KBS2 Happy Sunday

References

External links
  
 

Korean Broadcasting System original programming
South Korean travel television series
South Korean reality television series
2013 South Korean television series debuts